Ill Niño EP is a 2000 EP by American heavy metal band Ill Niño. It was produced by Dave Chavarri and distributed by CIA Records.

Track listing

Personnel
 Christian Machado: vocals, additional bass
 Marc Rizzo: guitar
 Jardel Paisante: guitar
 Lazaro Pina: bass
 Roger Vasquez: percussion
 Dave Chavarri: drums
 DJ Pookie: electronics

Ill Niño albums
2000 EPs